Danilo Mora (born 21 February 1961) is a Cuban rower. He competed in the men's coxed pair event at the 1980 Summer Olympics.

References

1961 births
Living people
Cuban male rowers
Olympic rowers of Cuba
Rowers at the 1980 Summer Olympics
Place of birth missing (living people)
Pan American Games medalists in rowing
Pan American Games gold medalists for Cuba
Rowers at the 1983 Pan American Games